Wuthering Heights is a 1959 Australian television play adapted from Emily Brontë's 1847 novel Wuthering Heights. It was directed by Alan Burke and based on a script by Nigel Kneale which had been adapted by the BBC in 1953 as a TV play starring Richard Todd. It was made at a time when Australian drama production was rare.

Premise
Heathcliff, a gypsy orphan, is adopted by the Earnshaw family at Wuthering Heights on the Yorkshire Moors. He loves Cathy Earnshaw and is hated by her brother Hindley. Cathy rejects Heathcliff, so he leaves, and she maries Edgar Linton. Heathcliff returns years later, a wealthy man, and takes up residence as master of Wuthering Heights. He marries Edgar's sister Isabella in order to make Cathy jealous.

Cast
Lew Luton as Heathcliffe
Delia Williams as Cathy Earnshaw
Annette Andre as Isabella 		
David Bluford 		
Richard Davies as Hindley Earnshaw	
Geoffrey King 		
Hugh Stewart 		
Nancye Stewart as Ellen Dean 		
Lou Vernon

Production

The novel was a study text for many Australian high schools. The production was mostly filmed live, but some segments were pre-recorded around Sydney. Lew Luton was a DJ and presenter of teen shows at the time.  Luton said he used Method acting for his performance.

Brunette Annette Andre, who played Isabella, dyed her hair blonde so as to contrast with dark-haired Delia Williams, who played Cathy. "We worked very hard on it," recalled Andre.

Reception
Wuthering Heights was one of three plays that Alan Burke directed that year, along with The Skin of Our Teeth and Misery Me. He said they all received "tiny ratings" and that Wuthering Heights "was too large for our television conditions, and things went wrong."

Critical
The TV critic for The Sydney Morning Herald thought the play was "straightforward enough in its story-telling and sufficiently wide-ranging in its techniques" but "hardly ever caught the necessary brooding Gothic spirit of the time, the place and the situation." He criticized Lew Luton as being too often "merely surly, when he should have been daemonic, and in general failed to reconcile his desire to work like a twentieth century actor." Other actors were praised, and Alan Burke's direction was called "carefully smooth; but there were moments when the spirit of the production was closer to Stella Gibbons than to Emily Brontë."

The reviewer for the Sydney The Sun-Herald thought it was "good TV in every respect... cast, acting, camera work and the smooth interpolation of film clips with the actual studio telecast" adding Delia Williams "played the part of the wayward, tempestuous Cathy to perfection" and said Luton was "excellent... although his make up and hairdo was rather unfortunately reminiscent of Marlon Brando's leather-jacketed cyclist in The Wild One." She also thought Richard Davies gave "one of the year's best TV acting jobs."

The reviewer for The Age said the play was disappointing and that "the atmosphere of bleakness and howling winds was not created with realism. Noises off were much too prevalent. The casting was not up to standard. . . . Luton showed a lack of understanding on the part of both actor and producer."

See also
List of live television plays broadcast on Australian Broadcasting Corporation (1950s)

References

External links

1950s Australian television plays
1959 television plays
Films based on Wuthering Heights
Films directed by Alan Burke (director)